Ishtakamya is a 2016 Kannada romantic comedy film directed by Nagathihalli Chandrashekhar is based on the 1980s novel of the same name written by Dodderi Venkatagiri Rao. The film features Vijay Suriya of Agni Sakshi fame, Mayuri Kyatari of Ashwini Nakshatra fame and Kavya Shetty in the lead roles and is releasing on 13 May  2016. Kannada's top film editor Srikanth edited the film.

Plot 
Dr. Aakarsh is a young and aspiring doctor who wants to treat poor people in his village. He is running a hospital which his grandfather has built. He meets with an accident with "Acchari" ( Mayuri Kyatari) and brings her to his hospital. While treating her, he slowly starts falling in love with her. Acchari is impressed by Dr Aakarsh's simplicity and his caring nature. A thick romance seems to develop between the two until they are confronted by Aditi (Kavya Shetty ) who claims to be the wife of Dr. Aakarsh.  This shocks Acchari and she demands an explanation from Aakarsh. Aakarsh reveals his past to Acchari. In the flashback, it is revealed that Aakarsh and Aditi were married. Aditi is an adamant woman who is also a "clean freak". She doesn't want to get closer to Aakarsh, this sparks differences between the couple and eventually Aditi leaves him.

However, Aditi later realizes her mistake and wants to get back together. This leaves Aakarsh in a fix. He has to decide between Acchari and Aditi. However, Aakarsh decides to surprise Aditi by taking her to a poet's house. But on their way Aditi meets with an accident. Acchari's mother confronts her to go away from the couple as Acchari's father too cheated her mother. Aditi dies at Aakarsh's hospital's door reminding that she had said 'I will never keep leg in this small nurse home even after death'. Acchari leaves to another place in aeroplane to achieve her dream to become a pilot. Aakarsh doesn't get Aditi neither Acchari.

Cast 
 Vijay Suriya as Dr. Aakarsh
 Mayuri Kyatari as Acchari
 Kavya Shetty as Aditi
 Suman Nagarkar as Roshini
 Prakash Belawadi as Vikranth
 Rangayana Raghu 
 Mandya Ramesh
 B. Jayashree
 Mimicry Dayanand
 Chikkanna as Nimbe

Soundtrack

The music composed by B. Ajaneesh Loknath comprises a poem written by Kuvempu. It is reported that the song named "Jenaguva" is shot in Kavishaila.

References

External links

 
 Official website
 

2016 films
Films based on Indian novels
Indian romantic comedy films
2016 romantic comedy films
2010s Kannada-language films
Films directed by Nagathihalli Chandrashekhar